WUCH (96.9 FM) is a radio station broadcasting a classic country music format. Licensed to Algood, Tennessee, United States, the station serves the Cookeville area. The station is currently owned by Larry Stone, through licensee Stonecom Cookeville, LLC, and features programming from Westwood One, Fox News Radio, and Motor Racing Network.

In September 2021, WUCH launched a classic country format, branded as "Highway 111 Country 96.9".

References

External links

Classic country radio stations in the United States
UCH
Putnam County, Tennessee
Radio stations established in 1997
1997 establishments in Tennessee